Muston is a surname. Notable people with the surname include:

Anwen Muston, British politician
Beau Muston (born 1987), Australian rules footballer 
Ged Muston (1927–2017), Australian Anglican bishop

See also
Maston
Musson (surname)